

The Nuclear, Biological and Chemical Protection Troops of the Russian Armed Forces are an organisation designed to reduce the losses of the Ground Forces and ensuring their combat tasks assigned during operations in conditions of radioactive, chemical and biological contamination, as well as at enhancing their survivability and protection against high-precision and other weapons.

History
In 1944, the Red Army's Chemical Troops had 19 brigades (14 technical and 5 chemical protection). After the end of World War II, most of them were disbanded.

General Major Vladimir Pikalov (promoted to Colonel General by 1975) commanded the Chemical Troops of the Ministry of Defence from March 1968 to December 1988. He was in charge of the specialised military units at the site of the Chernobyl Nuclear Power Plant disaster. Pikalov arrived at the scene on the afternoon of 26 April 1986, and assumed command of the specialised military units there. General Pikalov was later made a Hero of the Soviet Union for his actions there.

Among the 23 brigades of the Chemical Troops in the late 1980s were the 1st (:ru:1-я мобильная бригада РХБ защиты at Shikhany-2 (Vol'sk-18), two kilometres from Shikhany, in the Saratov Oblast of the Volga Military District, 2nd Brigade at Teikovo in the Moscow Military District, 3rd, 4th, 6th, 8th, 11th, 12th, 16th, 18th, 19th, 20th, 21st, 22nd, 23rd, 25th, 26th, 27th, and the 28th (28-ма окрема бригада радіаційного, хімічного, біологічного захисту) located in Severodonetsk in the Kyiv Military District.

In 1992, the Chemical Troops within the Russian Armed Forces were renamed the NBC Protection Troops.

Structure and tasks 

The basis of the NBC Protection Troops are multifunctional separate NBCP brigades which have subunits capable to perform all NBC protection activities. The Russians know them as Radiological, Chemical and Biological (RBC) troops. They often work within a combined arms army. Their main tasks include:

 identification and assessment of radiological, chemical and biological environment, scales and effects of damages of objects hazardous radiatively, chemically and biologically;
 protection of formations and units against the nuclear effects of mass destruction weapons and radiological, chemical and biological contamination;
 reducing the visibility of troops and facilities;
 disaster (damage) recovery in objects hazardous radiatively, chemically and biologically;
 causing loss to the enemy by using flame-incendiary means.

The NBC Protection Troops are organised for both conduct of hostilities using nuclear, biological and chemical weapons and without them and includes:
 nuclear detection;
 NBC reconnaissance and control;
 collection and processing of data and information on radiological, chemical and biological environment;
 notification of troops on NBC contamination;
 conducting special treatment (decontamination, degassing and disinfection) of armaments, military and special equipment, buildings and other objects, as well as sanitisation of personnel;
 aerosol counteraction against the enemy’s reconnaissance and targeting means.

The NBCP Troops are developing as dual-purpose forces, able to solve tasks both in war and peace times, in the aftermath of accidents and disasters in industrial facilities hazardous radiatively, chemically and biologically. Further build-up of their capacity is realized by creating a modern system to identify and assess the extent and effects of weapons of mass destruction, integrated with automated control systems of troops and weapons and stable functioning in the NBC threat environment and strong electronic countermeasures. In addition, there is a process to equip formations, units and subdivisions of NBCP with new, highly effective means of NBC reconnaissance, individual and collective defence, technical means of reducing the visibility and masking, flame-throwing incendiary weapons, as well as to introduce improved materials, formulations, methods and technical means of decontamination.

As of 2019, the commander of the NBC Protection Troops is Lieutenant General Igor Kirilov

Hardware

What follows is a partial list as of November 2018 of military hardware available to the Russian NBCP troops:

 RPO-A Shmel infantry rocket flamethrower
 PMK-4 gas mask
 TOS-1 Buratino or TOS-1A Solntsepyok flamethrower
 TOS-2 Tosochka flamethrower
 TDA-3 smoke generator on a 3-axle 53501 Kamaz chassis, is designed to camouflage military facilities
 TMS-65 is a specialized chemical vehicle on Ural-375 undercarriage
 RKhM-6 is a chemical reconnaissance vehicle on a four-axle BTR-80 base
 RPM-2 is a radiological reconnaissance vehicle on a four-axle BTR-80 base
 UTM-80 heat engine, designed to clean other equipment after exposure to NCB threats

Units

 1st Mobile NBC Protection Brigade (Shikhany-2, Oblast of Saratov) (MUN 71432, Central Military District)
 16th NBC Protection Brigade (Lesozavodsk) (MUN 07059, Eastern Military District)
 27th NBC Protection Brigade (Kursk) (MUN 11262, Western Military District)
 28th NBC Protection Brigade (Kamyshin, Volgograd Oblast) (MUN 65363, Southern Military District)
 29th NBC Protection Brigade (Yekaterinburg) (MUN 34081, Central Military District)
 2nd NBC Protection Regiment (Chapayevsk) (MUN 18664, 2nd Guards Combined Arms Army)
 4th NBC Protection Regiment (Sevastopol) (MUN 86862)
 6th NBC Protection Regiment (Sapyornoye, Leningrad Oblast, Priozersky District) (MUN 12086, 6th Combined Arms Army))
 9th NBC Protection Regiment (Shikhany), (MUN 29753)
 10th NBC Protection Regiment (Topchikha) (MUN 55121, 41st Combined Arms Army)
 17th NBC Protection Regiment (Krasnodar Krai) (49th Combined Arms Army)
 19th NBC Protection Regiment (Gorny, Zabaykalsky Krai) (MUN 56313, 29th Combined Arms Army)
 20th NBC Protection Regiment (Tsentralny, Volodarsky District) (MUN 12102, 1st Guards Tank Army)
 24th NBC Protection Battalion (20th Guards Combined Arms Army)
 25th NBC Protection Regiment (Sergeyevka, Pogranichny District) (MUN 58079, 5th Combined Arms Army)
 26th NBC Protection Regiment (Onokhoy) (MUN 62563, 36th Combined Arms Army)
 35th NBC Protection Regiment (Belogorsk, Amur Oblast) (MUN 59792, 35th Combined Arms Army)
 39th NBC Protection Regiment (Oktyabrsky, Kalachovsky District, Volgograd Oblast) (MUN 16390, 8th Guards Combined Arms Army)
 40th NBC Protection Regiment (Troitskaya, Ingushetia, Republic of Ingushetia) (MUN 16383, 58th Combined Arms Army)
 70th Separate Flamethrower Battalion (Razdolnoye, Primorsky Krai) (MUN 41474)

Videogallery

See also 
 NBC Protection Military Academy
 Canadian Joint Incident Response Unit
 2nd Dragoon Regiment (France)
 United States Army CBRN School
 Chemical Corps

References

External links

Military units and formations of Russia
NBC units and formations